Lest We Forget is a sculpture installed outside Salt Lake City's Pioneer Memorial Museum, in the U.S. state of Utah.

References

Outdoor sculptures in Salt Lake City
Sculptures of children in the United States
Sculptures of women in Utah
Statues in Utah